Katarzyna Kossakowska (died 1803), was a Polish noblewoman and politician.  She was an important politician in mid 18th-century Poland, and known for her opposition to King Stanislaw. She was known as a wit.

Her correspondence has been preserved.

She has been portrayed in literature.

References

18th-century Polish–Lithuanian politicians
18th-century Polish women
1803 deaths
Year of birth missing
Women letter writers
Kossakowski family
Bar confederates
18th-century letter writers
19th-century letter writers
18th-century Lithuanian women